The Southern miombo woodlands is a tropical grasslands and woodlands ecoregion extending across portions of Malawi, Mozambique, Zambia, and Zimbabwe.

It is one of four miombo woodlands ecoregions that span the African continent south of the Congo forests and East African savannas.

Geography
The Eastern miombo woodlands covers the hills and low plateaus in the watersheds of the Zambezi and Limpopo rivers, north and south of the Zambezi, and north and east of the Limpopo. The drier Zambezian and mopane woodlands occupy the lowlands along the Zambezi and its major tributaries, including the Shire and Lugenda, and the lowlands of the Limpopo. To the north and northwest, the Eastern miombo woodlands transition to the Central Zambezian miombo woodlands. To the southwest, they transition to the Southern Africa bushveld. The Southern Zanzibar-Inhambane coastal forest mosaic bounds the ecoregion on the southeast, along the Indian Ocean coast.

Zambia's capital Lusaka and Zimbabwe's capital Harare are in the ecoregion.

Flora
The predominant vegetation is savanna and open-canopy woodland. The predominant trees are species of Brachystegia (aka miombo), Julbernardia, and Isoberlinia.

Some eastward-facing mountains intercept winds from the Indian Ocean, and orographic rainfall sustain pockets of moist evergreen forest. These include the Moribane forest in Mozambique, and the Haroni and Rusitu reserves and Chirinda forest in Zimbabwe. The flora is similar to the coastal evergreen forests, and canopy trees include Newtonia buchananii,  Celtis mildbraedii, and Khaya anthotheca.

Fauna
The ecoregion is home to several large grazing mammals, including the African bush elephant (Loxodonta africana), black rhinoceros (Diceros bicornis), white rhinoceros (Ceratotherium simum), African buffalo (Synerus caffer), roan antelope (Hippotragus equinus), sable antelope (Hippotragus niger), Lichtenstein's hartebeest (Alcelaphus buselaphus lichtensteinii), southern reedbuck (Redunca arundium), greater kudu (Tragelaphus strepsiceros), common eland (Taurotragus oryx), and common tsessebe (Damaliscus lunatus). These large grazers generally have a low population density and large ranges, except for the roan antelope, which occurs in higher densities.

Larger carnivores include lion (Panthera leo), leopard (Panthera pardus), cheetah (Acinonyx jubatus), spotted hyena (Crocuta crocuta), African wild dog (Lycaon pictus), caracal (Caracal caracal), and side-striped jackal (Lupulella adusta).

Protected areas and conservation
22.5% of the ecoregion is in protected areas. Protected areas which cover part of the ecoregion include:
 Kasungu National Park in Malawi
 Zinave National Park in  Mozambique
 Lower Zambezi, Lukusuzi, and South Luangwa national parks in Zambia
 Chizarira and Matusadona national parks and Chipinge Safari Area in Zimbabwe

References

 
Afrotropical ecoregions
Ecoregions of Malawi
Ecoregions of Mozambique
Ecoregions of Zambia
Ecoregions of Zimbabwe
Tropical and subtropical grasslands, savannas, and shrublands
Zambezian region